The Goldsmith Prize for Investigative Reporting is an award for journalists administered by the Shorenstein Center on Media, Politics and Public Policy at Harvard University. The program was launched in 1991, with the goal of exposing examples of poor government, and encouraging good government in the United States. There is a $25,000 award for the winner.

The Goldsmith Awards Program is financially supported by an annual grant from the Greenfield Foundation.

Awardees 
2019 – J. David McShane and Andrew Chavez of The Dallas Morning News, "Pain and Profit"
2018 – Nina Martin of ProPublica and Renee Montagne of NPR, "Lost Mothers"
2017 –  Shane Bauer of Mother Jones, "My Four Months as a Private Prison Guard" 
2016 – Margie Mason, Robin McDowell, Martha Mendoza, and Esther Htusan of The Associated Press, "Seafood from Slaves" 
2015 – Carol Marbin Miller, Audra Burch, Mary Ellen Klas, Emily Michot, Kara Dapena and Lazaro Gamio of Miami Herald, "Innocents Lost" 
2014 – Chris Hamby, Ronnie Greene, Jim Morris and Chris Zubak-Skees of the Center for Public Integrity; and Matthew Mosk, Brian Ross and Rhonda Schwartz of ABC News, "Breathless and Burdened: Dying from Black Lung, Buried by Law and Medicine"
2013 – Patricia Callahan, Sam Roe and Michael Hawthorne of the Chicago Tribune, "Playing with Fire"
2012 – Matt Apuzzo, Adam Goldman, Eileen Sullivan and Chris Hawley of the Associated Press, "NYPD Intelligence Division"
2011 – Marshall Allen, and Alex Richards of Las Vegas Sun, "Do No Harm: Hospital Care in Las Vegas"
2010 – Raquel Rutledge of Milwaukee Journal Sentinel, report on "Cashing In on Kids"
2009 – Debbie Cenziper and Sarah Cohen of The Washington Post, investigative report "Forced Out"
2008 – Barton Gellman and Jo Becker of the Washington Post, investigative report "Angler: The Cheney Vice Presidency"
2007 – Charles Forelle, James Bandler and Mark Maremont of The Wall Street Journal, report on "unethical manipulation" and amassed millions of top executives
2006 – James Risen and Eric Lichtblau of The New York Times, investigative report "Domestic Spying"
2005 – Diana B. Henriques, business reporter for The New York Times, investigative report titled "Captive Clientele"
2004 – New York Times and Frontline, investigative report "Dangerous Business: When Workers Die". (received by David Barstow, Lowell Bergman, David Rummel)
2003 – Boston Globe, investigative report "Crisis in the Catholic Church"
2002 – Duff Wilson and David Heath of The Seattle Times
2001 – Karen Dillon of the Kansas City Star, investigative report "To Protect and Defend"
2000 – Donald Barlett and James Steele of Time, investigative report, "What Corporate Welfare Costs"
1999 – A team of reporters, of The Miami Herald, "Dirty Votes: The Race for Miami Mayor"
1998 – Duff Wilson, of The Seattle Times, "Fear in the Fields — How Hazardous Wastes Become Fertilizer"
1998 – Michael Duffy, Michael Weisskopf, and Viveca Novak of Time magazine, "Abuse of Campaign Finance Laws"
1997 – Glenn Bunting, Rich Connell, Maggie Farley, Sara Fritz, Evelyn Iritani, Connie Kang, Jim Mann, Alan Miller, and Rone Tempest, of the Los Angeles Times, "Illegal Democratic Campaign Contributions"
1996 – Russell Carollo, Carol Hernandez, Jeff Nesmith, and Cheryl Reed of The Dayton Daily News, "Military Secrets" and "Prisoners on Payroll"
1995 – Lizette Alvarez, and Lisa Getter of The Miami Herald, "Lost in America: Our Failed Immigration Policy"
1994 – Neill Borowski and Gilbert Gaul, of The Philadelphia Inquirer, investigative series, "Warehouses of Wealth: The Tax-Free Economy",
1993 – Douglas Frantz and Murray Waas of the Los Angeles Times, investigative series, prewar policies before the Gulf War.

Nominees

See also
Investigative journalism
Shorenstein Center on Media, Politics and Public Policy
Goldsmith Book Prize
Project On Government Oversight
Government Accountability Office

References

External links
Shorenstein Center on Media, Politics and Public Policy
Goldsmith Awards Program

American journalism awards
Awards established in 1991
1991 establishments in Massachusetts
Harvard University